Theodore Laurent Custers (born 10 August 1950 in Genk) is a retired Belgian footballer who played as a goalkeeper.

During his club career he played for Thor Waterschei, Antwerp FC, Helmond Sport, Espanyol Barcelona, KV Mechelen and SV Bornem. At international level, he also earned 10 caps for the Belgium national football team, and participated in the 1982 FIFA World Cup and UEFA Euro 1980. His nickname was "the Walrus" because of his distinctive moustache.

Honours

Player 

 Waterschei

 Belgian Third Division: 1973-74

International 
Belgium

 UEFA European Championship: 1980 (runners-up)
 Belgian Sports Merit Award: 1980

References

Royal Belgian Football Association: Number of caps
Profile at national-football-teams

1950 births
Living people
Belgian footballers
K. Waterschei S.V. Thor Genk players
Royal Antwerp F.C. players
Helmond Sport players
RCD Espanyol footballers
K.V. Mechelen players
Belgian Pro League players
Eerste Divisie players
La Liga players
Belgium international footballers
UEFA Euro 1980 players
1982 FIFA World Cup players
Belgian expatriate footballers
Expatriate footballers in the Netherlands
Expatriate footballers in Spain
Belgian expatriate sportspeople in the Netherlands
Belgian expatriate sportspeople in Spain
Association football goalkeepers
Sportspeople from Genk
Footballers from Limburg (Belgium)

pl:René Verheyen